The Cherokee Tobacco Case, 78 U.S. (11 Wall.) 616 (1870), is a United States court case with implications relating to tribal sovereignty in the United States.

Two Cherokee men, Elias C. Boudinot and Stand Watie, refused to pay taxes on tobacco manufactured in the Cherokee Nation, as required by the Internal Revenue Act 1868.  They argued that they were exempt from paying the taxes by the Cherokee Treaty of 1866.  The Supreme Court decided against the men, stating that a law of Congress can supersede the provisions of a treaty.

Boudinot and Watie, with the help of attorneys A. Pike, R. W. Johnson, and B.F. Butler, argued that they were exempt from paying the tax on the tobacco. They used the argument that Article 10 of the Treaty of 1866 with the Cherokee Nation stated,

They used this part because to them it meant that any Cherokee and freed person living in Cherokee Nation had the right to do whatever they wished with their products of their farms and had the right to do so without being taxed.
On the other hand, Amos Akerman, U.S. Attorney General, and Benjamin Bristow, Solicitor General, on behalf of the United States, argued that, the 107th section of the Internal Revenue Act of July 20, 1868, states that,

In other words that under the Internal Revenue Act of 1868, the United States had the right to tax anyone within the countries boundaries as well as within the exterior boundaries.  Also because this act was passed two years after the Cherokee Nation Treaty, it overruled any previous acts.

Justice Swayne wrote the decision in this case for a deeply fractured Court; three justices concurred with Swayne, two dissented and three did not participate.  Swayne indicated the legal direction he was heading by noting at the outset of the opinion that the case involved, “first the question of the intention of Congress, and second, assuming the intention to exist, the question of its power, to tax certain tobacco in the Territory of the Cherokee nation in the face of a prior treaty between that nation and the United States that such tobacco should be exempt from taxation.” His decision yielded one of the most problematic and ambiguous doctrines in Indian law- whether tribes, as preexisting entities, may be included or excluded under the scope of general laws enacted by Congress.  The documentary evidence-including the preexisting political status of tribes, prior Supreme Court precedent, the treaty relationship, and the constitutional clauses acknowledging the distinctive status of tribal polities- clearly support exclusion.  Indian territories, in other words, were not regarded as included in congressional enactments unless the tribe had given its explicit consent and unless they were expressly included in the law.

The Cherokee Tobacco case, however, created a new interpretation- that general congressional acts do apply to tribes unless Congress explicitly excludes them.   Thus, Boudinot and Watie were required to pay the tax on the tobacco.   This decision not only affected these two men, but it also affected every decision that gave weight to the idea that Indian Nations were sovereign nations.  With this decision, people would argue that if countries outside the United States, sovereign countries, were not required to pay taxes to the United States then how was a nation within its borders required to pay taxes and still be a sovereign nation.  The holding in this case was a huge blow to the fight for Indian sovereignty.

References

External links
 

1870 in American law
United States tobacco case law
United States Native American case law
United States Supreme Court cases
United States Supreme Court cases of the Chase Court
United States court cases involving the Cherokee Nation